Bentonville Battlefield is a North Carolina state historic site at 5466 Harper House Road in Johnston County, North Carolina. It belongs to the North Carolina Department of Natural and Cultural Resources and is the site of the 1865 Battle of Bentonville, fought in the waning days of the American Civil War.  It was declared a National Historic Landmark in 1996.

Description and history
Bentonville Battlefield State Historic Site is one of more than 20 NC State Historic Sites interpreting the history of the state of North Carolina. The site is located in southern Johnston County, near Newton Grove, NC.  The site has a Visitors Center that is located at the junction of Harper House Road and Mill Creek Church Road (County Roads 1008 and 1108, respectively), roughly at the southwestern corner of the area in which the battle took place, which extends most of the way to Bentonville, and is also the location of the Harper House, the only surviving building from the time of the battle.  Evidence of earthworks erected by both Union and Confederate forces is visible in the area. The site also includes an extensive driving tour and walking trails that cover the battlefield. 

The Battle of Bentonville was fought March 19–21, 1865, and was the largest Civil War battle fought in North Carolina.  The Confederate defeat marked a serious weakening of one of its last surviving major armies, but was a significant enough engagement that it convinced Union General Ulysses S. Grant to leave General William T. Sherman in North Carolina, in order to further subdue the surviving forces led by General Joseph E. Johnston.

The American Battlefield Trust and its partners have acquired and preserved  of the battlefield since 1960. About 1/3 of original battlefield land is now owned by the state of North Carolina.

Exhibits
Visitors to Bentonville Battlefield can tour the restored Harper House, used as a US XIV Corps field hospital during the battle and now furnished as a Civil War field hospital, and includes a reconstructed kitchen and enslaved people's quarters.  Exhibits at the park's visitor center focus on the battle, and include interactive maps, artifacts and displays about soldiers and commanders from both armies.   There is also a 15-minute audiovisual program about the battle.  Outdoor exhibits in the park include the Federal XX Corps reserve trenches, the Harper family cemetery, a Confederate cemetery, several monuments, and a 10-mile driving tour with 8 tour stops. The site also features nearly 5 miles of walking trails along original trenches built during the battle.

See also
 List of National Historic Landmarks in North Carolina
 National Register of Historic Places listings in Johnston County, North Carolina

References

External links

 Bentonville Battlefield
 Bentonville Battleground State Historic Site - official site
 The Battle of Bentonville: Caring for Casualties of the Civil War, a National Park Service Teaching with Historic Places (TwHP) lesson plan

American Civil War museums in North Carolina
Conflict sites on the National Register of Historic Places in North Carolina
Battlefields of the Western Theater of the American Civil War
Historic districts in North Carolina
Historic house museums in North Carolina
Museums in Johnston County, North Carolina
National Historic Landmarks in North Carolina
National Register of Historic Places in Johnston County, North Carolina
North Carolina in the American Civil War
North Carolina State Historic Sites
Protected areas of Johnston County, North Carolina